Nakayama (中山) may refer to:

People
Nakayama (surname)

Places
Nakayama, Ehime, a town in Ehime Prefecture
Nakayama, Tottori, a town in Tottori Prefecture
Nakayama, Yamagata, a town in Yamagata Prefecture
Nakayama-dera, a temple in Hyōgo Prefecture
Zhongshan District, Taipei(中山區), a district in Taipei named after Sun Yat-sen, also known as his Japanese name Nakayama shō. The Japanese broadcasting of Zhongshan metro station is pronounced as Nakayama in the station.

Other uses
Nakayama Racecourse, a horse racing track in Chiba Prefecture
Nakayama Grand Jump, an annual steeplechase
Nakayama Circuit, a motorsport venue in Okayama Prefecture
Nakayama Station (Kanagawa)
Nakayama Station (Hyogo)
Nakayamadaira-Onsen Station
Nakayama lemma, a lemma in commutative algebra